Potamonautes johnstoni is a species of freshwater crab in the family Potamonautidae. It is found in rivers in Kenya and Tanzania, with unconfirmed records from Malawi and the Democratic Republic of the Congo. The species' distribution includes Kilimanjaro, Nekona, Mrogoro (near Dar es Salaam) and the Usambara Mountains.

References

Potamoidea
Freshwater crustaceans of Africa
Crustaceans described in 1885
Taxa named by Edward J. Miers
Taxonomy articles created by Polbot